Ebrahim Abednezhad (born 22 August 1992) is an Iranian footballer.

Career statistics

References

1992 births
Living people
Iranian footballers
Sportspeople from Tabriz
Tractor S.C. players
Machine Sazi F.C. players
Sumgayit FK players
Persian Gulf Pro League players
Azerbaijan Premier League players
Association football midfielders
Iranian expatriate footballers
Expatriate footballers in Turkey
Iranian expatriate sportspeople in Turkey